Naked City: Justice with a Bullet is a 1998 criminal drama television film about two detectives who have to protect two girls who have been robbed of all their money and luggage. Kim Poirier has a cameo appearance in the film.

Cast
Scott Glenn as Sgt. Daniel Muldoon
Courtney B. Vance as Officer James Halloran
Giancarlo Esposito as Chaz Villanueva
Eli Wallach as Deluca
Kathryn Erbe as Sarah Tubbs
Robin Tunney as Merri Coffman
Barbara Williams as Eva

External links 
 

1998 films
1998 crime drama films
American crime drama films
1990s English-language films
1990s American films